The Pampas meadowlark (Leistes defilippii) is a species of bird in the family Icteridae. It is found in Argentina, Brazil, and Uruguay.

Its natural habitats are temperate shrubland, pampas grassland, subtropical or tropical dry lowland grassland, and pastureland. It is threatened by habitat loss.

References

External links
 Range of the Pampas meadowlark - Oiseaux.net

Pampas meadowlark
Birds of the Pampas
Pampas meadowlark
Pampas meadowlark
Taxonomy articles created by Polbot